Dante Bowe is an American Christian worship singer, and songwriter. He is known as a former member of the Bethel Music collective and Maverick City Music.

In 2017, Bowe released his debut single, "Potter and Friend" featuring Jesse Cline, which was shortly followed with the independent release of his debut studio album, Son of a Father.

Bowe signed with Bethel Music in June 2019. In 2020, He made his debut appearance with Bethel with the single "Champion" which was featured on the album Revival's in the Air. This was also followed by three standalone singles: "Don't Talk About It" featuring Jesse Cline, "Be Alright" featuring Amanda Lindsey Cook, and "Voice of God" featuring Steffany Gretzinger and Chandler Moore. In 2021, he released his second studio album, Circles, which contained the hit single "Joyful". "Joyful" won the GMA Dove Award for Contemporary Gospel Recorded Song of the Year at the 2021 GMA Dove Awards. Circles debuted at No. 7 on Billboard'''s Top Gospel Albums chart in the United States. Bowe also featured on several collaborations, most notably the song "Wait on You" alongside Elevation Worship, Maverick City Music and Chandler Moore. Bowe received five nominations at the 2022 Grammy Awards, ultimately winning the Grammy Award for Best Contemporary Christian Music Album for his work on Old Church Basement (2021) by Elevation Worship and Maverick City Music.

 Early life 
Dante Bowe grew in a Christian community in North Carolina. Bowe's grandparents were Christian ministers. Bowe attributed the cultivation of his musical appreciation to his parents, and went on to develop a love for singing after participating in a seventh-grade talent show. At ten years old, Bowe was molested by a church elder. Bowe's parents separated when he was eleven years old, and at twelve, he found out that they were drug dealers in order to sustain their family. Bowe became a converted Christian at sixteen years, and his parents stopped dealing drugs around the same time, with his mother also becoming a converted Christian. At sixteen, Bowe also had his spiritual awakening through the music of Kierra Sheard, saying that the record Free (2011) had changed his life. Bowe dropped out of high school and committed himself to full-time ministry, becoming employed by Eddie James Ministries as a worship leader.

 Career 
In January 2017, Dante Bowe released his debut single, "Potter and Friend" featuring Jesse Cline. He then independently released his debut studio album, Son of a Father, on March 31, 2017.

On January 11, 2019, Dante Bowe released "The Giant Is Dead" featuring Travis Greene, as a standalone single. In July 2019, Bethel Music announced that they signed Dante Bowe, subsequently joining the Bethel Music collective. On May 15, 2020, Bowe and Bethel Music released "Champion" as the first promotional single from the album Revival's in the Air (2020). Bowe later released "Champion" as an official single on July 17, 2020. "Champion" peaked at No. 28 on the US Hot Christian Songs chart. On May 27, 2020, Bowe and Bethel Music released "Anything Is Possible" as a promotional single from Revival's in the Air. On August 14, 2020, Bowe released "Don't Talk About It" featuring Jesse Cline as a standalone single. On August 26, 2020, Bowe released "Be Alright" featuring Amanda Lindsey Cook, as a standalone single. On September 30, 2020, Bowe released "Voice of God" which featured Steffany Gretzinger and Chandler Moore. "Voice of God" peaked at No. 36 on the Hot Christian Songs chart.

On March 1, 2021, Dante Bowe announced that he will be releasing his second studio album, Circles, on March 26. He released "Joyful" as the lead single from Circles on March 12, 2021. "Joyful peaked at No. 14 on the Hot Christian Songs chart, and at No. 3 on the Hot Gospel Songs chart. Circles was released on March 26, 2021. Circles debuted at No. 7 on the Top Gospel Albums chart in the United States. Bowe alongside Chandler Moore featured on "Wait on You" by Elevation Worship and Maverick City Music, which was released as the third promotional single to their collaborative live album, Old Church Basement (2021), on April 23, 2021. "Wait on You" debuted at No. 9 on the US Hot Christian Songs chart and at No. 1 on the Hot Gospel Songs chart, becoming Bowe's first top ten entry on the Hot Christian Songs chart and his first number one hit on the Hot Gospel Songs chart.

Bowe received three nominations for the 2021 GMA Dove Awards, being nominated for New Artist of the Year, Contemporary Gospel Recorded Song of the Year for "Joyful", and Gospel Worship Recorded Song of the Year for "Voice of God", ultimately winning the Contemporary Gospel Recorded Song of the Year for "Joyful". Billboard named Dante Bowe the Top New Gospel Artist of 2021.

At the 2022 Grammy Awards, Bowe received three Grammy Award nominations for Best Gospel Performance/Song, for his singles "Voice of God" and "Joyful" as well as a group nomination for "Wait on You" by Elevation Worship and Maverick City Music, becoming the first person to achieve multiple nominations in the Best Gospel Performance/Song category since its formation in 2015. Bowe also received group nominations as a member of Maverick City Music for Old Church Basement in the Best Contemporary Christian Music Album category and Jubilee: Juneteenth Edition (2021) in the Best Gospel Album category. Bowe ultimately won the Grammy Award for Best Contemporary Christian Music Album for his contribution on Old Church Basement at the 2022 ceremony.

On March 4, 2022, Bowe released "The Healing" with Blanca as a single. "The Healing" peaked at No. 9 on the Hot Christian Songs chart. Bowe released "Nail Scarred Hands" as a single on April 1, 2022. On May 13, 2022, Bowe announced that he will embark on his first headlining tour, dubbed the Worship Nights Tour, joined by fellow Maverick City Music member Aaron Moses and Aodhan King of Hillsong Young & Free and set to visit eight cities in the United States during the summer of 2022. Bowe and Crowder released "God Really Loves Us" featuring Maverick City Music as a single on June 3, 2022. "God Really Loves Us" peaked at No. 9 on the Hot Christian Songs chart, and at No. 1 on the Hot Gospel Songs chart.

On September 26, 2022, Maverick City Music announced via a statement published on Instagram that they will be pausing their professional relationship with Dante Bowe, citing behaviour that was inconsistent with their core values and beliefs, the nature of which was not specified. Bowe released a statement stating that he would be taking a break from social media and expressed his commitment to God's purpose for his life. His social media posts have subsequently been handled by “team Dante”.

Bowe received four nominations for the 2022 GMA Dove Awards, being nominated for Songwriter of the Year - Artist, Song of the Year for co-writing "Promises", and Rock/Contemporary Recorded Song of the Year and Short Form Music Video of the Year (Performance) for "I Love You" alongside Judah and Aaron Moses. At the 2023 Grammy Awards, Bowe also received a nomination for Best Contemporary Christian Music Performance/Song for "God Really Loves Us (Radio Version)" alongside Crowder, as well as Best Contemporary Christian Music Album for Breathe EP, of which Dante wrote on 4 of the 8 songs.  

 Discography 

Studio albums
 Son of a Father (2017)
 Circles (2021)

 Tours 
Headlining
 Worship Nights Tour (2022)
 Joyful The Tour (2022)

Supporting
 Welcome To Maverick City Tour (with Maverick City Music) (2021)
 What Are We Waiting For? – The Tour (with For King & Country) (2022)
 Kingdom Tour with (Maverick City Music and Kirk Franklin) (2022)

 Awards and nominations 
 GMA Dove Awards 

!
|-
| 2020
| "Promises"
| Gospel Worship Recorded Song of the Year
| 
| 
|-
| rowspan="3" | 2021
| Dante Bowe
| New Artist of the Year
| 
| rowspan="3" | 
|-
| "Joyful"
| Contemporary Gospel Recorded Song of the Year
| 
|-
| "Voice of God"
| Gospel Worship Recorded Song of the Year
| 
|-
| rowspan="4" | 2022
| "Promises"
| Song of the Year
| 
| rowspan="4" | 
|-
| Dante Bowe
| Songwriter of the Year - Artist
| 
|-
| rowspan="2" | "I Love You"
| Rock/Contemporary Recorded Song of the Year of the Year
| 
|- 
| Short Form Music Video of the Year (Performance)
| 
|-
|}

 Grammy Awards 

!
|-
| rowspan="6" | 2022
| "Joyful"
| rowspan="3" | Best Gospel Performance/Song
| 
| rowspan="7" | 
|-
| "Voice of God"
| 
|-
| "Wait on You"
| 
|-
| "Jireh"
| Best Contemporary Christian Music Performance/Song
| 
|-
| Jubilee: Juneteenth Edition| Best Gospel Album
| 
|-
| Old Church Basement''
| Best Contemporary Christian Music Album
| 
|-
| 2023
| "God Really Loves Us"
| Best Contemporary Christian Music Performance/Song
| 
|-
|}

See also 
 List of Christian worship music artists

Notes

References

External links 
 
  on Bethel Music

1992 births
Living people
Christians from North Carolina
American male singer-songwriters
American performers of Christian music
Composers of Christian music
People from Rockingham, North Carolina
Singer-songwriters from North Carolina
21st-century American male singers
21st-century American singers